Sven Carlsson (May 5, 1915 – 1995) was a Swedish curler.

Teams

Personal life
His daughter Elisabeth Högström (née Carlsson) is a well-known Swedish women curler, world champion and five times European champion.

References

External links
 

1915 births
1995 deaths
People from Lidköping Municipality
Swedish male curlers
Swedish curling champions
Sportspeople from Västra Götaland County
20th-century Swedish people